Romana is a comune (municipality) in the Province of Sassari in the Italian region Sardinia, located about  northwest of Cagliari and about  south of Sassari.

Romana borders the following municipalities: Cossoine, Monteleone Rocca Doria, Padria, Thiesi, Villanova Monteleone.

Demographic evolution

References

Cities and towns in Sardinia